Prince Xun of the Second Rank, or simply Prince Xun, was the title of a princely peerage used in China during the Manchu-led Qing dynasty (1644–1912). As the Prince Xun peerage was not awarded "iron-cap" status, this meant that each successive bearer of the title would normally start off with a title downgraded by one rank vis-à-vis that held by his predecessor. However, the title would generally not be downgraded to any lower than a feng'en fuguo gong except under special circumstances.

The first bearer of the title was Yongzhang (永璋; 1735–1760), the Qianlong Emperor's third son. Yongzhang was posthumously honoured with the title "Prince Xun of the Second Rank" by his father in 1760. The title was passed down over six generations and held by six persons.

Members of the Prince Xun peerage

 Yongzhang (永璋; 1735–1760), the Qianlong Emperor's third son, posthumously honoured with the title "Prince Xun of the Second Rank"
 Mianyi (綿懿; 1771–1809), Yongxing's second son and Yongzhang's adopted son, inherited the Prince Xun peerage as a beile in 1787, demoted to second class zhenguo jiangjun in 1804, promoted to beizi in 1805, posthumously restored as a beile
 Yixu (奕緒; 1791–1809), Mianyi's eldest son, held the title of a zhenguo jiangjun from 1799 to 1809, promoted to beizi in 1809
 Zaiqian (載遷; 1849–1899), Yixu's second son, held the title of a feng'en zhenguo gong from 1858 to 1899
 Pukui (溥葵; 1873–1926), Zaiqian's eldest son, held the title of a third class zhenguo jiangjun from 1898 to 1899, promoted to feng'en fuguo gong in 1899
 Puquan (溥荃; 1878–?), Zaiqian's second son, held the title of a first class fuguo jiangjun from 1903
 Yugui (毓桂; 1906–?), Puquan's eldest son
 Yusen (毓槮; 1913–?), Puquan's second son and Pukui's adopted son, held the title of a feng'en fuguo gong from 1926
 Yijing (奕經; 1791–1853), Mianyi's second son, held the title of a second class zhenguo jiangjun from 1816 to 1843, stripped of his title in 1843
 Yiji (奕紀; 1797–1863), Mianyi's third son, initially a second class fuguo jiangjun, promoted to second class zhenguo jiangjun in 1832, stripped of his title in 1840
 Zaixiao (載䥵; 1821–1872), Yiji's son
 Pugu (溥顧; 1844–1902), Zaixiao's son
 Yubin (毓邠; 1870–?), Pugu's son
 Zaijian (載鏗; 1826–1871), Yiji's son
 Pudui (溥㟋; 1848–1903), Zaijian's son
 Yuping (毓平; 1881–?), Pudui's son
 Hengyin (恆蔭; 1909–?), Yuping's son

Family tree

See also
 Prince Cheng (成)
 Royal and noble ranks of the Qing dynasty

References
 

Qing dynasty princely peerages